Nehru ministry may refer to:

First Nehru ministry, the Indian government headed by Jawaharlal Nehru from 1947 to 1952
Second Nehru ministry, the Indian government headed by Jawaharlal Nehru from 1952 to 1957
Third Nehru ministry, the Indian government headed by Jawaharlal Nehru from 1957 to 1962
Fourth Nehru ministry, the Indian government headed by Jawaharlal Nehru from 1962 to 1964

See also 
Jawaharlal Nehru